Hixson is the surname of the following people:
Allie Hixson (1924–2007), American feminist advocate 
Chris Hixson (born 1974), American football quarterback
Chuck Hixson (born 1947), American football player
Francis Hixson (1833–1909), commander of naval forces in colonial New South Wales
Kim Hixson (born 1957), American politician
Peter Hixson (born 1966), American animation artist
Sheila E. Hixson (1933-2022), American politician

See also
Hixon (surname)

English-language surnames